Sila Nerangalil Sila Manidhargal is a 2022 Indian Tamil-language drama hyperlink film written and directed by debutant Vishal Venkat and produced by AR Entertainment and Trident Arts. The film stars Ashok Selvan in lead role with Nassar, K. Manikandan, Abi Hassan, Anju Kurian , Reyya, K. S. Ravikumar, Riythvika and Sivamaran in supporting roles. The film's music is composed by Radhan, with cinematography handled by Meyyendiran and editing done by Prasanna GK. The film was released in theatres on 28 January 2022 and also received favourable reviews .

Cast 
 Ashok Selvan as Vijaykumar
 Nassar as Selvaraaj
 K. Manikandan as Rajasekar
 Abi Hassan as Pradeesh
 Reyya as Malar
 K. S. Ravikumar as Arivazhagan
 Riythvika as Kayal
 Anju Kurian as Rithu
 Praveen Raja as Praveen
 Bhanupriya
 Ilavarasu
 Abhishek Kumar as Srivatsu
 Rishikanth as Murali
 Sivamaran

Production

Development 
Sila Nerangalil Sila Manithargal was the late writer Jayakanthan's award-winning novel, which was adapted later into a film of the same name in 1977 by A. Bhimsingh. In July 2021, the title of Ashok Selvan's new project was announced by Kamal Haasan as Sila Nerangalil Sila Manidhargal (with a different story) in Twitter. In December 2021, the children of Jayakanthan had appealed to Kamal Hassan to avoid reusing the title since the title was synonymous with their father's name. But still the title was unchanged.

Filming 
Filming began in January 2021 and was completed by that December.

Soundtrack 
The soundtrack and score is composed by Radhan and the album featured three songs. The audio rights were acquired by Sony Music India.

Release

Theatrical 
The film was released in theatres on 28 January 2022.

Marketing and home media 
Actor Kamal Haasan who launched the first look poster of the film released the film's trailer. The post-theatrical streaming rights of the film were bought by Aha and the satellite rights by Colors Tamil.

Reception 
Logesh Balachandran of The Times of India who gave the film 3.0 out of 5 stars stated that "Regret can make all of us feel an implacable bitterness like no other emotions. When every character in the film goes through a similar emotion, we are forced to be a part of their journey and introspect our own tales. Sila Nerangalil Sila Manithargal is a heartwarming film with some takeaways for all generations." Avinash Ramachandran of Cinema Express rated the film 4.5 out of 5 stating that "This film is an example of the talent Tamil cinema has at its disposal; let’s hope then that they too get well-utilised before it is too late." Behindwoods rated the film 2.75 out of 5 stars and wrote that "Sila Nerangalil Sila Manidhargal ends up as an engaging watch due to the good performances and writing." Vishal Menon of Film Companion stated that "All of this contributes a lot to how we want to overlook an overall lack of finesse that could have been fixed with a bigger budget and a stronger supporting cast. We also want to excuse how underwritten Abi Hassan’s portions feel and the dialogue writing here, even though it deals with a fascinating idea for a separate short film. But despite these flaws and its generally flat making style, Sila Nerangalil Sila Manidhargal is a nicely-written drama about screwed-up people and how a singular event presents all four of them with a chance at redemption."

References

External links 
 

2020s Tamil-language films
2022 directorial debut films
2022 drama films
2022 films
Hyperlink films
Indian drama films